In agriculture, gardening, and forestry, broadcast seeding is a method of seeding that involves scattering seed, by hand or mechanically, over a relatively large area. This is in contrast to:
precision seeding, where seed is placed at a precise spacing and depth;
hydroseeding, where a slurry of seed, mulch and water is sprayed over prepared ground in a uniform layer.

Broadcast seeding is of particular use in establishing dense plant spacing, as for cover crops and lawns. In comparison to traditional drill planting, broadcast seeding will require 10–20% more seed. It is simpler, faster, and easier than traditional row sowing. Broadcast seeding works best for plants that do not require singular spacing or that are more easily thinned later. After broadcasting, seed is often lightly buried with some type of raking action, often done using vertical tillage tools. Utilizing these tools increases the success rate of germination by increasing seed-to-soil contact. 

Seeds sown in this manner are distributed unevenly, which may result in overcrowding. This method may not ensure that all seeds are sown at the correct depth. Incorrect depth, if too deep, would result in germination that would not allow the young plant to break the surface of the soil and prevent sprouting. If they are not sown evenly then there would be a lack of various nutrients from sunlight, oxygen, et cetera, in many crops or plants. 

Not all seeds are good candidates for broadcast seeding. Often, only smaller seeds will sprout and continue to grow successfully when planted by way of broadcasting. In general, the larger the seed, the deeper it can be planted.

See also
 Aerial seeding

References

Further reading
 

Seeds
Horticulture
Forest management